The West Maui Mountains, West Maui Volcano, or Mauna Kahālāwai which means "holding house of water," is approximately 1.7 million years old and forms a much eroded shield volcano that constitutes the western quarter of Maui. Since its last eruption approximately 320,000 years ago, the West Maui Mountains have undergone substantial stream erosion.

The three moku (districts) of West Maui are Lahaina, Kāanapali, and Wailuku. Wailuku is also known as "Pūalikomohana" ("west isthmus"), or "Nā Wai Ehā" ("the four waters"). The port of Lahaina lies on the southwestern slope.

The summit peak at  elevation is called "Puu Kukui," and its name translates to "candlenut hill".

Puu Kukui Watershed Preserve 

Established in 1988, the Puu Kukui Preserve is the largest private nature preserve in the State of Hawaii.  Since 1994, the  preserve has been managed by Maui Land & Pineapple Company in participation with The Nature Conservancy and the State Natural Area Partnership.  These groups work together to protect the watershed lands of the West Maui mountain.

Geological history 
The West Maui Mountains were formed through at least three series of major volcanic eruptions during its shield building period. Rocks from the latest major shield-building eruptions are called the Honolua volcanic series, which are roughly 500,000 years old. However, there were several rejuvenated stage eruptions more recently, the last dating to roughly 320,000 years ago. Though eruptions may have recently occurred as little as 25,000 years ago.

References

External links 
 
 Puu Kukui Watershed Preserve
 

Landforms of Maui
Mountains of Hawaii
Volcanoes of Maui Nui
Hawaiian–Emperor seamount chain
Shield volcanoes of the United States
Hotspot volcanoes
Polygenetic shield volcanoes
Pleistocene shield volcanoes
Pleistocene Oceania
Cenozoic Hawaii